Danny Bennett (? in Dublin – 3 August 2008) is an Irish former football player.

He joined Shamrock Rovers in 1957 and made his debut as a left half at Glenmalure Park on 12 January 1958 against Sligo in a 5–1 win .

He played in Rovers' two games against OGC Nice in the European Champion Clubs' Cup in 1959.

Honours
League of Ireland: 1
  Shamrock Rovers F.C. – 1958/59

Sources 
 The Hoops by Paul Doolan and Robert Goggins

Association footballers from County Dublin
Republic of Ireland association footballers
Shamrock Rovers F.C. players
League of Ireland players
2008 deaths
Year of birth missing
Association footballers not categorized by position